Andrew  or Andy McDermott may refer to:
 Andrew McDermott (singer) (1966–2011), English singer
 Andrew McDermott (footballer) (1889–1915), Scottish footballer
 Andy McDermott (born 1974), British author
 Andy McDermott (footballer) (born 1977), Australian footballer
 Andy McDermott (soccer) (born 1976), American soccer player